Ruby Ridge was the site of an eleven-day siege in 1992 in Boundary County, Idaho, near Naples. It began on August 21, when deputies of the United States Marshals Service (USMS) initiated action to apprehend and arrest Randy Weaver under a bench warrant after his failure to appear on firearms charges stemming from a miscommunication caused by a probation officer giving Weaver the incorrect court date of March 20 whilst the correct court date was February 20. During a surveillance operation Weaver's dog noticed a U.S. Marshal team of six and was shot by one of the officers leading to Sammy Weaver firing at the team. Sammy Weaver was then shot and killed causing an exchange in fire in which Harris shot and killed Deputy U.S. Marshal William Francis Degan. Weaver refused to surrender, and members of his immediate family, and family friend Kevin Harris, resisted as well. The Hostage Rescue Team of the Federal Bureau of Investigation (FBI HRT) became involved as the siege developed. 

In the subsequent siege of the Weaver residence, led by the FBI, Weaver's wife Vicki was killed by FBI sniper fire while holding her baby daughter. All casualties occurred in the first two days of the operation. The siege and standoff were ultimately resolved by civilian negotiators. Harris surrendered and was arrested on August 30, while Weaver and his three daughters surrendered the next day.

Randy Weaver and Kevin Harris were subsequently arraigned on a variety of federal criminal charges, including first-degree murder for the death of Degan. Harris was acquitted of all charges, and Weaver was acquitted of all charges except for the original bail condition violation for the firearms charges and for having missed his original court date. He was fined $10,000 and sentenced to eighteen months in prison, credited with time served plus an additional three months, and released after sixteen months.

During the federal criminal trial of Weaver and Harris, Weaver's attorney, Gerry Spence, made accusations of criminal wrongdoing against the agencies involved in the incident, in particular the FBI, the USMS, the Bureau of Alcohol, Tobacco, and Firearms (ATF), and the United States Attorney's Office (USAO) for Idaho. At the trial's end, the Department of Justice's Office of Professional Responsibility formed the Ruby Ridge Task Force (RRTF) to investigate Spence's charges. A redacted HTML version of the RRTF report, publicly released by Lexis Counsel Connect, raised questions about all the participating agencies' conduct and policies. The Justice Department later posted a more complete PDF version of the report.

Both the Weaver family and Harris brought civil suits against the federal government over the firefight and siege. The Weavers won a combined out-of-court settlement in August 1995 of $3.1 million. After numerous appeals, Harris was awarded a $380,000 settlement in September 2000.

To answer public questions about Ruby Ridge, the Senate Subcommittee on Terrorism, Technology and Government Information held hearings between September 6 and October 19, 1995, and later issued a report calling for reforms in federal law enforcement to prevent a repeat of the losses of life at Ruby Ridge and restore public confidence in federal law enforcement. It was observed that the Ruby Ridge incident and the 1993 Waco siege involved many of the same agencies (FBI HRT and ATF) and some of the same personnel (the FBI HRT commander). The Government Accountability Office (GAO) also conducted a review of federal policies about use of deadly force, publishing it in 1995.

In 1997, the Boundary County prosecutor indicted FBI HRT sniper Lon Horiuchi for manslaughter before the statute of limitations for the charge could expire; the case, Idaho v. Horiuchi, was moved to federal court, which has jurisdiction over federal agents. The case was dismissed because of the supremacy clause. The United States Court of Appeals for the Ninth Circuit ruled in 2001 that Horiuchi could be tried on state charges. A new county prosecutor, Brett Benson, had been elected in 2000 and dismissed the case, saying it was unlikely the state would be able to prove the criminal charges. Benson's decision was controversial.

The events that took place at Ruby Ridge, and the law enforcement response during the Waco siege roughly six months later, have been cited by commentators as catalysts for the Oklahoma City bombing by Timothy McVeigh and Terry Nichols.

Geography 
Ruby Ridge is the southernmost of four ridges that extend east from the Bottleneck/Roman Nose mountain range toward the Kootenai River. Caribou Ridge lies north of it, and the area between them drains into the Ruby Creek. Weaver insisted that his cabin, located north of the creek, was on Caribou Ridge, and that "Ruby Ridge" was a press invention. Both ridge names were in use before the Weavers moved to the area, as in a Forest Service report on the 1967 Sundance Fire.

Development 
Randy Weaver, a former Iowa factory worker and U.S. Army Green Beret, moved with his wife and four children to northern Idaho during the 1980s so they could "home-school his children and escape what he and his wife Vicki saw as a corrupted world." In 1978, Vicki, the religious leader of the family, began to have recurrent dreams of living on a mountaintop and believed that the apocalypse was imminent. After the birth of their son, Samuel, the Weavers began selling their belongings and visited the Amish to learn how to live without electricity. They bought  of land on Ruby Ridge in 1983 and began building a cabin; the property was in Boundary County on a hillside on Ruby Creek opposite Caribou Ridge, northwest of nearby Naples.

In 1984, Randy Weaver and his neighbor Terry Kinnison had a dispute over a $3,000 land deal. Kinnison lost the ensuing lawsuit and was ordered to pay Weaver an additional $2,100 in court costs and damages. Kinnison wrote letters to the Federal Bureau of Investigation (FBI), the Secret Service, and the county sheriff in which he alleged that Weaver had threatened to kill Pope John Paul II, President Ronald Reagan, and Idaho Governor John V. Evans.

In January 1985, the FBI and the Secret Service launched an investigation into allegations that Weaver had made threats against Reagan and other government and law enforcement officials. On February 12, Weaver and his wife were interviewed by two FBI agents, two Secret Service agents, and the Boundary County sheriff and his chief investigator. The Secret Service had been told that Weaver was a member of Aryan Nations (an antisemitic, neo-Nazi, white supremacist terrorist organization) and that he had a large weapons cache at his residence. Weaver denied these allegations, and the government filed no charges. On three or four occasions, the Weavers had attended Aryan Nations meetings at Hayden Lake, where there was a compound for government resisters and white supremacists/separatists.

The investigation noted that Weaver associated with Frank Kumnick, who was known to associate with members of the Aryan Nations. Weaver told the investigators that neither he nor Kumnick was a member of the Aryan Nations but he stated that Kumnick was "associated with The Covenant, The Sword, and the Arm of the Lord." On February 28, Randy and Vicki Weaver filed an affidavit with the county courthouse alleging that their personal enemies were plotting to provoke the FBI into attacking and killing the Weaver family. On May 6, the Weavers sent President Reagan a letter claiming that their enemies may have sent Reagan a threatening letter under a forged signature. No evidence of such a letter surfaced, but in 1992, the prosecutor cited the 1985 letter as an overt act of the Weaver family conspiracy against the federal government.

ATF involvement 
The Bureau of Alcohol, Tobacco and Firearms (ATF) first became aware of Weaver in July 1986, when he was introduced to a confidential ATF informant at a meeting at the World Aryan Congress. The informant portrayed himself as a weapons dealer working with motorcycle gangs. Weaver had been invited to the meeting by Kumnick, the original target of the ATF investigation. It was Weaver's first time at this Congress. Over the next three years, Weaver and the informant met several times. In July 1989, Weaver invited the informant to his home to discuss forming a group to fight the "Zionist Organized Government", referring to the U.S. government.

In October 1989, the ATF claimed that Weaver sold the informant two sawed-off shotguns, with the overall length of the guns shorter than the limit set by federal law. In November 1989, Weaver accused the ATF informant of being a spy for the police; Weaver later wrote he had been warned by "Rico V." The informant's handler, Herb Byerly, ordered him to have no further contact with Weaver. Eventually, FBI informant Rico Valentino outed the ATF informant to Aryan Nations security.

In June 1990, Byerly attempted to use the sawed-off shotgun charge as leverage to get Weaver to act as an informant for his investigation into Aryan Nations. Weaver refused to become a "snitch", and the ATF filed the gun charges in June 1990. The ATF alleged that Weaver was a bank robber with criminal convictions. (Those claims were false: at that time Weaver had no criminal record. The 1995 Senate investigation found: "Weaver was not a suspect in any bank robberies.") A federal grand jury indicted Weaver  in December 1990 for making and possessing, but not for selling, illegal weapons in October 1989.

The ATF concluded it would be too dangerous for agents to arrest Weaver at his property. In January 1991, ATF agents posed as broken-down motorists and arrested Weaver when he and Vicki stopped to assist. Weaver was told of the charges against him, released on bail, and told that his trial would begin on February 19, 1991. On January 22, the judge in the case appointed attorney Everett Hofmeister as Weaver's legal representative. The same day, Weaver called probation officer Karl Richins and told him that he had been instructed to contact Richins on that date. Richins did not have the case file at that time, so he asked Weaver to leave his contact information and said he would contact him when he received the paperwork. According to Richins, Weaver did not give him a telephone number. Hofmeister sent Weaver letters on January 19, January 31, and February 5, asking Weaver to contact him to work on his defense within the federal court system.

On February 5, the trial date was changed from February 19 to 20 to give participants more travel time following a federal holiday. The court clerk sent the parties a letter informing them of the date change, but the notice was not sent directly to Weaver, only to Hofmeister. On February 7, Richins sent Weaver a letter indicating that he had the case file and needed to talk with Weaver. This letter erroneously said that Weaver's trial date was March 20. On February 8, Hofmeister again attempted to contact Weaver by letter informing him that the trial was to begin on February 20 and that Weaver needed to contact him immediately. Hofmeister also made several calls to individuals who knew Weaver, asking them to have Weaver call him. Hofmeister told U.S. District Court Judge Harold Lyman Ryan that he had been unable to reach Weaver before the scheduled court date.

When Weaver did not appear in court on February 20, Ryan issued a bench warrant for failure to appear in court. On February 26, Ken Keller, a reporter for the Kootenai Valley Times, telephoned the U.S. Probation Office and asked whether Weaver did not show in court on February 20 because the letter Richins sent him had an incorrect date. Upon finding a copy of the letter, the Chief Probation Officer, Terrence Hummel, contacted Ryan's clerk and informed them of the incorrect date in the letter. Hummel also contacted the U.S. Marshals Service (USMS) and Weaver's attorney, informing them both of the error. Judge Ryan, however, refused to withdraw the bench warrant.

The USMS agreed to put off executing the warrant until after March 20 in order to see whether Weaver would show up in court on that day. If he were to show up on March 20, the Department of Justice claimed that all indications are that the warrant would have been dropped. But instead, the U.S. Attorney's Office (USAO) called a grand jury on March 14. The USAO did not inform the grand jury of Richins's letter and the grand jury issued an indictment for failure to appear.

U.S. Marshals Service involvement 
When the Weaver case passed from the ATF to the USMS, no one informed the marshals that the ATF had attempted to solicit Weaver as an informant.

As the law enforcement arm of the federal court, the USMS were responsible to arrest and bring in Weaver, now considered a fugitive. Weaver simply stayed in his remote home, threatening to resist any attempt to take him by force.

Weaver was known to have an intense distrust of government. The erroneous Richins letter is believed to have compounded this sentiment and may have contributed to Weaver's reluctance to appear for trial. He was suspicious of what he thought were inconsistent messages from the government and his lawyer; he began to think there was a conspiracy against him. Weaver came to believe that he would not receive a fair trial if he were to appear in court. His distrust grew even further when Hofmeister erroneously told him that if he lost the trial, he would lose his land, essentially leaving Vicki homeless, and that the government would take away his children.

USMS officers made a series of attempts to have Weaver surrender peacefully, but he refused to leave his cabin. Weaver negotiated with U.S. Marshals Ron Evans, W. Warren Mays, and David Hunt through third parties from March 5 to October 12, 1991, when Assistant U.S. Attorney Ron Howen directed that the negotiations cease. The U.S. Attorney directed that all negotiations go through Hofmeister, but Weaver refused to talk with him. Marshals began preparing plans to capture Weaver to stand trial on the weapons charges and his failure to appear at the correct trial date.

Although marshals stopped the negotiations as ordered, they made other contact. On March 4, 1992, U.S. Marshals Ron Evans and Jack Cluff drove to the Weaver property and spoke with Weaver, posing as real-estate prospects. At a March 27, 1992, meeting at USMS headquarters, Art Roderick code-named the operation "Northern Exposure". Surveillance teams were dispatched and cameras set up to record activity at Weaver's residence. Marshals observed that Weaver and his family responded to vehicles and other visitors by taking up armed positions around the cabin until the visitors were recognized.

Threat source profile 
Beginning in February 1991, the USMS developed a Threat Source Profile on Weaver. Agents' failure to integrate new information into that profile was criticized in a 1995 report by a subcommittee of the Senate Judiciary Committee:

The Subcommittee is ... concerned that, as Marshals investigating the Weaver case learned facts that contradicted information they previously had been provided, they did not adequately integrate their updated knowledge into their overall assessment of who Randy Weaver was or what threat he might pose. If the Marshals made any attempt to assess the credibility of the various people who gave them information about Weaver, they never recorded their assessments. Thus, rather than maintaining the Threat Source Profile as a living document, the Marshals added new reports to an ever-expanding file, and their overall assessment never really changed. These problems rendered it difficult for other law enforcement officials to assess the Weaver case accurately without the benefit of first-hand briefings from persons who had continuing involvement with him.

Many of the people the USMS used as third party go-betweens on the Weaver case—Bill and Judy Grider, Alan Jeppeson, and Richard Butler—were assessed by the Marshals as more radical than the Weavers. When Deputy U.S. Marshal (DUSM) Dave Hunt asked Grider, "Why shouldn't I just go up there ... and talk to him?", Grider replied, "Let me put it to you this way. If I was sitting on my property and somebody with a gun comes to do me harm, then I'll probably shoot him."

The Subcommittee said that the profile included "a brief psychological profile completed by a person who had conducted no firsthand interviews and was so unfamiliar with the case that he referred to Weaver as 'Mr. Randall' throughout". A later memo circulated within the Justice Department opined that:

Rivera helicopter incident 
Following a flyover by a hired helicopter for Geraldo Rivera's Now It Can Be Told television show on April 18, 1992, the USMS received media reports that Weaver had shot at the helicopter. That day in Idaho, U.S. Marshals were installing surveillance cameras overlooking the Weaver property. The field report for April 18, 1992, filed by Marshal W. Warren Mays, reported seeing a helicopter near the Weaver property, but not that any shots were heard. In an interview with a Coeur D'Alene newspaper, Weaver denied that anyone had fired at the helicopter. When interviewed by the FBI, the helicopter pilot Richard Weiss said that Weaver had not fired on his helicopter. The Report of the RRTF to the OPR (1994) said, when the "indictment [of Weaver] was presented to the grand jury, the prosecution had evidence that no shots had been fired at the helicopter."

Media reports that Weaver had fired on the Rivera helicopter became part of the justification later cited by U.S. Marshal Wayne "Duke" Smith and FBI HRT Commander Richard Rogers in drawing up the Ruby Ridge rules of engagement on August 21–22, 1992. Also, in spite of Weiss's repeated denials that shots had been fired at his helicopter, Howen charged that, as Overt Act 32 of the Weavers' Conspiracy Against the Federal Government, Randy, Vicki, and Harris fired two shots at the Rivera helicopter.

Operation "Northern Exposure" was suspended for three months due to the confirmation hearings for United States Marshals Service Director Henry E. Hudson.

Encounter near Weaver's cabin
On August 21, 1992, six Marshals were sent to scout the area to determine suitable places away from the cabin to apprehend and arrest Weaver. The marshals, dressed in military camouflage, were equipped with night-vision goggles and M16 rifles. DUSMs Art Roderick, Larry Cooper, and William F. "Bill" Degan formed the reconnaissance team, while DUSMs David Hunt, Joseph Thomas, and Frank Norris formed an observation post (OP) team on the ridge north of the cabin.

At one point, Roderick threw two rocks at the Weaver cabin to test the dogs' reaction. The action provoked the dogs; Weaver's friend, Kevin Harris, and Weaver's 14-year-old son, Samuel ("Sammy"), emerged and followed the dog "Striker" to investigate. Harris and the younger Weaver said that they were hoping the dog had noticed a game animal as the cabin was out of meat. The recon team (Roderick, Cooper, and Degan) initially retreated through the woods in radio contact with the OP team, but later took up hidden defensive positions.

Later, the OP team and the Weavers claimed the dogs were alerted to the recon team in the woods after neighbors at the foot of the mountain started their pickup truck. Sammy and Harris followed Striker on foot through the woods while Randy, also on foot, took a separate logging trail; Vicki, Sara, Rachel, and baby Elisheba remained at the cabin. The OP team were anxious at first, but then relaxed. Randy encountered the Marshals at the "Y"; Roderick claimed to have yelled, "Back off! U.S. Marshal!" upon sighting Weaver, and Cooper said he had shouted, "Stop! U.S. Marshal!" By their account, Sammy and Striker came out of the woods about a minute later. When the Marshals' position was revealed by the dog "Striker", a yellow Labrador Retriever, DUSM Roderick shot the dog dead.
Seeing this, Sammy Weaver reportedly said to the Marshals, "You've killed my dog, you son of a bitch!", and then shot in the direction of Roderick. DUSM Cooper then shot towards Sammy Weaver and Kevin Harris, who both sought cover.  Harris, once finding cover behind a tree stump, then returned fire with one unaimed shot, which eventually killed DUSM William Francis "Bill" Degan. Sammy Weaver, now retreating up a hill was then shot in the back and killed by DUSM Cooper.

A later ballistics report showed that nineteen rounds were fired during the fight. DUSM Roderick fired one shot from an M16A1 (which killed "Striker", the dog, by entering his body two inches from the dog's anus, and exiting the chest), then Sammy fired three from a .223 Ruger Mini-14 (at Roderick), Degan fired seven from an M16 (at Harris and Weaver, while moving at least ), and Cooper fired six from a 9 mm Colt submachine gun (at Harris and Weaver), Harris then fired two from a .30-06 M1917 Enfield Rifle (striking and killing DUSM Degan). After the federal agents began firing, Sammy was killed by a shot to the back while retreating. Harris fired one unaimed shot and killed DUSM Degan.

The origin of the shot that killed Sammy was of critical concern in all investigations. At the time of the writing of the Ruby Ridge: Report (1996), the Senate Subcommittee on Terrorism, Technology and Government Information, chaired by Senator Arlen Specter, observed that the government's position at trial was that Cooper had fired the shot. The Subcommittee engaged additional experts and ultimately declined to draw a final conclusion. The Justice Department's Ruby Ridge Task Force (RRTF) report to the Office of Professional Responsibility (OPR, 1994) states:

 It was concluded there was no indication he intended to shoot Weaver.

Reporter Jess Walter, in his work Ruby Ridge: The Truth and Tragedy of the Randy Weaver Family concludes that Cooper fired the bullet that killed Sammy Weaver.

In 1997, Boundary County Sheriff Greg Sprungl conducted an independent search of the "Y", and his investigator, Lucien Haag, discovered and confirmed that a bullet found in that search matched DUSM Cooper's 9 mm Colt submachine gun and contained fibers that matched Sammy's shirt, conclusively proving DUSM Cooper shot 14-year-old Sammy Weaver in the back as he retreated.

Harris's and the federal agents' accounts differ as to who fired first. In the 1993 trial over charges in Degan's death, prosecutors alleged that Harris had fired the first shot. Harris asserted self-defense and was acquitted.

On cross-examination by the defense, ballistics experts called by the prosecution testified that the physical evidence contradicted neither the prosecution's nor the defense's theories of the gunfight. Martin Fackler testified that Roderick fired the shot or shots that killed Striker, that Degan fired the shot that hit Sammy in the right elbow, that Harris shot and killed Degan, and that Cooper "probably" shot and killed Sammy. 

Roderick and Cooper stated that Striker preceded Harris and Sammy out of the woods. They said Degan challenged Harris, who turned, shot and fatally wounded Degan before he could fire first. They said Roderick shot the dog once, Sammy fired twice at Roderick, and Roderick returned fire. Roderick and Cooper testified that they heard multiple gunshots from the Weaver party. Cooper testified that he fired two three-shot bursts at Harris and saw Harris fall "like a sack of potatoes" with leaves flying up in front of him, presumably from the impact of a round. Cooper sought cover. He testified that he saw Sammy run away and radioed OP team member Dave Hunt that he had wounded or killed Harris.

As described by Randy and Sara Weaver, in their book The Federal Siege (1998), Harris's version of events differed, as follows. Harris told them Striker was followed out of the woods by Sammy and Harris, and that the dog ran up to Cooper. He said the dog ran to Roderick, who shot it in front of Sammy. Sammy yelled, "You shot my dog, you son of a bitch!", and fired a shot at Roderick. Harris said that Degan came out of the woods and shot Sammy in the arm. Harris fired and hit Degan in the chest. According to the Weavers, Harris said that Cooper fired at Harris, who ducked for cover, and Cooper fired again, hitting Sammy in the back, who fell. Harris fired about 6 feet (2 m) in front of Cooper, forcing him to take cover. Only then did he hear Cooper identify himself as a U.S. Marshal. Harris said he checked Sammy and found him dead, and ran to the Weavers' cabin.

After the firefight at the "Y", Hunt and Thomas went to a neighbor's house to call for assistance from the USMS Crisis Center. Norris, Cooper, and Roderick stayed with Degan's body at the "Y". Randy and Vicki went to the "Y" and retrieved Sammy's body. Randy, Vicki and Harris placed the body in a guest cabin near the main cabin. From 11:15 a.m. onward, Hunt reported to the Crisis Center in Washington, D.C., that no further gunfire was heard.

Siege and controversy 
In the aftermath of the gunfight on August 21 at 11:20 am PDT, DUSM Hunt requested immediate support from Idaho law enforcement, and he also alerted the FBI by notifying it that a Marshal had been killed. Following Hunt's phone call, the Marshals Service Crisis Center was activated under the direction of Duke Smith, associate director for Operations. The Marshals Service Special Operations Group (SOG) was alerted to deploy. In response to the USMS call, the Boundary County sheriff's office mobilized. Also in response to the USMS request, Idaho Governor Cecil Andrus declared a state of emergency in Boundary County, allowing use of the Idaho National Guard Armory at Bonners Ferry and, after an initial delay, to use National Guard armored personnel carriers (APCs). Soon thereafter, the Idaho State Police arrived at the scene.

FBI Headquarters in Washington, DC, responded by sending the Hostage Rescue Team (HRT) from Quantico to Idaho. Special Agent in Charge (SAC) Eugene Glenn of the Salt Lake City FBI office was appointed Site Commander with responsibility for all active individuals from the FBI, ATF, and USMS. A stand-off ensued for eleven days, as several hundred federal agents surrounded the house, and negotiations for a surrender were attempted.

Special ROE and sniper/observer deployment 
By Saturday, August 22, special rules of engagement (ROE) were drafted and approved by FBI Headquarters and the Marshal Service for use on Ruby Ridge. According to the later RRTF report to the DOJ (1994), the Ruby Ridge ROE were as follows:

 "If any adult in the area around the cabin is observed with a weapon after the surrender announcement had been made, deadly force could and should be used to neutralize the individual."
 "If any adult male is observed with a weapon prior to the announcement deadly force can and should be employed if the shot could be taken without endangering any children."
 "If compromised by any dog the dog can be taken out."
 "Any subjects other than Randy Weaver, Vicki Weaver, Kevin Harris presenting threat of death or grievous bodily harm FBI rules of deadly force apply. Deadly force can be utilized to prevent the death or grievous bodily injury to oneself or that of another."

(From the sworn statement of FBI SAC Eugene Glenn).

As noted in a footnote to the report in this crucial section:

The ROE were communicated to agents on site, including communication to HRT sniper/observers prior to deployment, communications that included the change of "adult" to "adult male" to exclude Vicki Weaver. Some deployed FBI agents, in particular the sniper/observers, would later describe the adopted ROE as a "green light" to "shoot on sight".

On Wednesday, August 26, four days after Vicki was killed, the ROE that had been in effect since the arrival of the HRT were revoked. Per Glenn's direction, the FBI's Standard Deadly Force Policy replaced the ROE to guide the law enforcement personnel that were to be deployed to the cabin perimeter. The FBI rules of deadly force in effect in 1992 stated that:

This was in stark contrast to the permissive ROE adopted for the Ruby Ridge stand-off.

Deployment of sniper/observers, ROE understanding 
On August 22, the second day of the siege, between 2:30–⁠3:30 pm, the FBI HRT sniper/observer teams were briefed and deployed to the cabin on foot.

According to the RRTF report to the DOJ, there were various views and interpretations taken of these ROEs by members of FBI SWAT teams in action at the Ruby Ridge site. Denver SWAT team leader Gregory Sexton described them as "severe" and "inappropriate." Two members of the Denver SWAT team said they were "strong" and a "departure from the ... standard deadly force policy", "inappropriate", and of a sort one "had never been given" before. The latter of these two members said that "other SWAT team members were taken aback by the Rules and that most of them clung to the FBI's standard deadly force policy." Another team member responded to the briefing on the ROE with "[y]ou've gotta be kidding."

But most of the FBI HRT sniper/observers accepted the ROE as modifying the deadly force policy. According to later interviews, HRT sniper Dale Monroe saw the ROE as a "green light" to shoot armed adult males on sight, and HRT sniper Edward Wenger believed that if he observed armed adults, he could use deadly force, but he was to follow standard deadly force policy for all other individuals. Fred Lanceley, the FBI Hostage Negotiator at Ruby Ridge, was "surprised and shocked" at the ROE, the most severe rules he had heard in more than 300 hostage situations. He later characterized the ROE as being inconsistent with standard policy. The 1996 Senate report criticized the ROE as "virtual shoot-on-sight orders."

Sniper shoots: R. Weaver is wounded, V. Weaver is killed 
(The sniper testified at the later trial that he had put his crosshairs on Weaver's spine, but Weaver moved at the last second.) As Weaver, his 16-year-old daughter Sara, and Harris ran back toward the house, Horiuchi fired a second bullet, wounding Harris in the chest. This bullet killed Vicki Weaver, who was standing behind the door in the cabin where Harris entered. Vicki was holding the Weavers' 10-month-old baby Elisheba.

Constitutionality of the second shot 
The RRTF report to the DOJ's Office of Professional Responsibility (OPR) of June 1994 stated unequivocally in conclusion (in its executive summary) that the rules that allowed the second shot to have been made did not satisfy constitutional standards for legal use of deadly force. The 1996 report of the U.S. Senate Judiciary Committee's Subcommittee on Terrorism, Technology and Government Information, Arlen Specter [R-PA], chair, concurred, with Senator Dianne Feinstein [D-CA] dissenting. The RRTF report said that the lack of a request by the marshals to the Weavers to surrender was "inexcusable." Harris and the two Weavers were not believed to be an imminent threat (since they were reported as running for cover without returning fire).

The later Justice task force criticized Horiuchi for firing through the door, when he did not know if anyone was on the other side of it. While there is a dispute as to who approved the rules of engagement which Horiuchi followed, the task force condemned the rules of engagement that allowed shots to be fired without a request for surrender.

Situational reevaluation, ROE is suspended, the siege ends 
The FBI's HQ and the Site Commanders in Idaho both re-evaluated the situation based on information about what had happened on August 21 which they were receiving from U.S. Marshals Hunt, Cooper and Roderick. On August 23, repeated attempts to negotiate with Weaver via a bullhorn failed; there was no response from the cabin.

On about Monday, August 24, the fourth day of the siege, FBI Deputy Assistant Director Danny Coulson, who did not know that Vicki Weaver had been killed, wrote a memo with the following content:

The stand-off was ultimately resolved by civilian negotiators including Bo Gritz, to whom Weaver agreed to speak. Through Gritz's mediation, Harris, who had earlier urged Weaver to end his suffering, surrendered on August 30 (Sunday). He was removed via stretcher, and then he was flown by an Air Force medical evacuation helicopter to Sacred Heart Medical Center in Spokane. Weaver allowed the removal of his wife's body, which Gritz oversaw.

The FBI HRT Commander gave Gritz a deadline to get the remaining Weavers to surrender, and if they did not surrender on the day of the deadline, he said he would resolve the standoff by launching a tactical assault. Weaver and his daughters surrendered the next day; both Harris and Weaver were arrested. Harris was in serious condition at Sacred Heart, but U.S. Marshals did not allow his parents to see him (or talk by telephone) until Monday evening, after a federal court order was issued. Weaver's daughters were released to the custody of relatives. Federal officials considered charging Sara, who was 16, as an adult.

Weaver was transferred by military helicopter to the airport at Sandpoint and from there he was flown by USMS jet to Boise. There he was given a brief medical examination at St. Luke's Medical Center. He was held at the Ada County jail and arraigned in federal court the following day, Tuesday, September 1.

Trials of Weaver and Harris 
Weaver and Harris were charged with a variety of offenses; their trial in U.S. District Court in Boise began in April 1993, and was presided over by Judge Edward Lodge. Weaver's defense attorney, Gerry Spence, rested his case in mid-June without calling any witnesses for the defense, instead seeking to convince the jury through cross-examination aimed at discrediting government evidence and witnesses. Weaver was ultimately acquitted in July of all charges except missing his original court date and violating his bail conditions, for which he was sentenced in October to 18 months imprisonment and fined $10,000. Credited with time served and good behavior, Weaver served less than 16 months and was released from the Canyon County jail in Caldwell in mid-December.

Harris was defended by attorney David Nevin and was acquitted of all charges. Exactly five years after the incident (August 21, 1997), he was indicted by Boundary County prosecutor Denise Woodbury for the first-degree murder of DUSM Bill Degan, but the charge was dismissed in early October on grounds of double jeopardy, because he had been acquitted in the federal criminal trial on the same charge in 1993.

Federal investigations of law enforcement 

Defense counsels for Weaver and Harris alleged throughout their 1993 trial that agents of the ATF, USMS, and FBI were themselves guilty of serious wrongdoing. The Department of Justice (DOJ) created the Ruby Ridge Task Force (RRTF) to investigate events. It delivered a 542-page report on June 10, 1994, to the DOJ Office of Professional Responsibility (OPR). (This RRTF report, originally available in a highly redacted form, later became available in a much more complete form.)

Questions persisted about Ruby Ridge and the subsequent Waco siege, which involved the same agencies and many of the same officials. The Senate Subcommittee on Terrorism, Technology and Government Information held fourteen days of hearings on these incidents and allegations of misconduct, ending on October 19, 1995. The hearings were televised on C-SPAN. Both the internal 1994 Ruby Ridge Task Force Report and the public 1995 Senate subcommittee report on Ruby Ridge criticized the rules of engagement as unconstitutional.

A 1995 GAO investigation was conducted on the policies regarding use of force by federal law enforcement agencies. Its report said: "In October 1995, Treasury and Justice adopted use of deadly force policies to standardize the various policies their component agencies had adopted over the years." The major change was that agencies required a law enforcement agent to have reasonable belief of an "imminent" danger of death or serious physical injury in order to use deadly force. This brought all federal LEA deadly force policies in line with the U.S. Supreme Court rulings Tennessee v. Garner, 471 U.S. 1, 18 (1985) and Graham v. Connor, 490 U.S. 386 (1989), which applied to state and local law enforcement agencies.

In 1997 Michael Kahoe, the chief of the FBI violent crime section, pled guilty to obstruction of justice for destroying a report critical of the agency's role at Ruby Ridge.  He was sentenced to 18 months and a $4,000 fine.

Civil suits 
Randy Weaver and his daughters filed a wrongful death suit for $200 million which was related to the killing of his wife and son. In an out-of-court settlement in August 1995, the federal government awarded Randy Weaver $100,000 and it also awarded $1 million to each of his three daughters. The government did not admit that it had committed any wrongdoing in the deaths of Sammy and Vicki. On the condition of anonymity, a DOJ official told The Washington Post that he believed that the Weavers would have probably won the full amount if the case had gone to trial.

The attorney for Harris pressed Harris's civil suit for damages, although federal officials vowed that they would never pay someone who had killed a U.S. Marshal. In September 2000, Harris was awarded a $380,000 settlement by the government.

State criminal charges 
In 1997, Boundary County prosecutor Denise Woodbury indicted FBI HRT sniper Lon Horiuchi for manslaughter on state charges, just before the statute of limitations for this crime expired. She appointed a special prosecutor to conduct the case. But in 1998 the trial was removed to federal court because Horiuchi had been acting in the line of duty as a federal law enforcement officer. Judge Lodge quickly dismissed the case on grounds of sovereign immunity.

The decision to dismiss charges was reversed (6–5) in 2001 by an en banc panel of the Ninth Circuit, which held that enough uncertainty about the facts of the case existed for Horiuchi to stand trial on state manslaughter charges. Boundary County prosecutor Brett Benson, who had defeated Woodbury in the May 2000 primary and won the November election, decided to drop the case. He said he believed that it was unlikely the state could prove the criminal charges, and too much time had passed. He also believed his decision would enable the process of healing in the county. Attorney Stephen Yagman, who had been appointed as the special prosecutor, said that he vehemently disagreed with the decision. He suggested that the case could still be prosecuted if the Boundary County prosecutor later changed again.

Later life of the Weavers 
Randy Weaver and his daughter, Sara, wrote The Federal Siege at Ruby Ridge (1998), about the incident, which was published in paperback.

The Weaver family, including Randy, later moved to Kalispell, Montana. Sara and the other two Weaver daughters are employed there. After becoming a born again Christian, Sara Weaver said in 2012 that she had forgiven the federal agents who killed her mother and brother.

Randy Weaver died on May 11, 2022, at the age of 74.

Domestic terrorism 

American domestic terrorists Timothy McVeigh and Terry Nichols claimed that revenge for the federal government's poor handling of Ruby Ridge and the Waco siege was their motivation for the Oklahoma City bombing. On April 19, 1995, the second anniversary of the fire that ended the Waco siege, they detonated a massive truck bomb in front of the Alfred P. Murrah Federal Building, killing 168 people, including numerous women and children; injuring 680 others, and destroying more than one third of the building.

In popular culture 
A CBS miniseries about the Ruby Ridge incident, titled Ruby Ridge: An American Tragedy, aired on May 19 and 21, 1996. It was based on the book Every Knee Shall Bow by reporter Jess Walter. It starred Laura Dern as Vicki, Kirsten Dunst as Sara, and Randy Quaid as Randy. Later that year the television series was adapted as a full-length TV movie, The Siege at Ruby Ridge.

In 1999, bluegrass musician Peter Rowan addressed the events at Ruby Ridge in his song "The Ballad of Ruby Ridge".

Ruby Ridge was the subject of Criminal Minds, Season Three, episode 7, "Identity" (2007). Agent David Rossi says that he was at Ruby Ridge during the siege.

In 2017, it was the focus of the 323rd episode of American Experience, the 5th episode of its 29th season.

The standoff, including the shooting of Vicki Weaver, is featured in the first episode of the Paramount Network television miniseries Waco (2018).

Tara Westover, in her memoir Educated (2018), referred to this incident, noting her own family's preparations to defend their isolated home against a potential siege by "the Feds".

The Ruby Ridge incident was the subject of the first season of the narrative podcast series Slate Presents. The four-episode season, titled Standoff: What Happened at Ruby Ridge? ran as a stand-alone miniseries hosted by journalist Ruth Graham.

In 2020, the incident was featured in a season of Fox Nation's Scandalous.

See also 

 2003 standoff in Abbeville, South Carolina
 American militia movement
 Branch Davidians
 Christian Identity
 Critical Incident Response Group (CIRG)
 Leonard Peltier
 List of killings by law enforcement officers in the United States
 Michigan Militia
 Militia of Montana
 Montana Freemen
 Oklahoma City bombing, inspired by Ruby Ridge
 Rainbow Farm
 Bundy standoff
 Sagebrush Rebellion
 Shannon Street massacre
 Singer-Swapp Standoff (1988)
 Waco siege

Bibliography

Primary sources 
  

 Ridge Task Force (November 9, 2006 rel.) [June 10, 1994].Report of the Ruby Ridge Task Force to the Office of Professional Responsibility [OPR] of Investigation of Allegations of Improper Governmental Conduct in the Investigation, Apprehension and Prosecution of Randall C. Weaver and Kevin L. Harris [OPR legacy, highly redacted version]. Washington, DC: U.S. Department of Justice.

  Reproduced in published book form by Diane Publishing, Collingdale, PA, .

Secondary sources

References and notes

Further reading and viewing

Further sources 
 
 
 
 .

Other books

Other reports 
 [primary source] Note, the author and date of publication do not appear on the title page or mast head of the document, but are inferred from other sources.

Other articles 
  Relates Ruby Ridge to the 1985 MOVE bombing by the Philadelphia police, causing fire, the deaths of eleven occupants, and destruction of 65 houses in the West Philadelphia neighborhood. See also

Other documentaries 
Randy Weaver and the Siege at Ruby Ridge have been the focus of numerous documentaries, including:
 "Ruby Ridge Investigation", by Nightline 1995, ABC News; 
 Atrocities at Ruby Ridge: the Randy Weaver Story, Produced by KPOC-TV 1995; VHS tape distributed by The FOREND Times, Inc.
 "American Standoff," Retro Report / New York Times, October 26, 2014.
 A&E Network American Justice series, episode 047 – "Deadly Force": A look at controversial law enforcement policy. Features the police bombing of the MOVE headquarters in Philadelphia, which killed 11, and the shootings of Randy Weaver's wife and son at Ruby Ridge. Bill Kurtis hosts.
 PBS American Experience: "Ruby Ridge", episode S29E07, February 14, 2017. (This episode is also available on Netflix .)
 Season 1, Episode 1: "The Legend of Ruby Ridge" of the documentary series Secret Rulers of the World. – April 2001

External links 
 G. Spence, From Freedom to Slavery, excerpts from Chapter 2, about the trial of Randy Weaver , (Spence was his defense attorney)
 Famous Trials: R. Weaver, U Missouri-Kansas City Law
 CBS News August 10, 2001, "New Ruby Ridge Probe"
 CBS News 60 Mins, May 11, 2001, with T. McVeigh
 CBS News November 25, 2002, "FBI Whistleblower Harassed"
 "Idaho vs Randy Weaver" (2006), CourtTV Crime Library
 Ruby Ridge , American Patriot Friends Network

1992 in American politics
1992 controversies in the United States
Anti-Federalism
Armed standoffs in the United States
Conflicts in 1992
+Ruby
Animals shot dead by law enforcement officers in the United States
American police officers killed in the line of duty
Gun politics in the United States
Federal Bureau of Investigation controversies
Law enforcement controversies in the United States
Law enforcement operations in the United States
Boundary County, Idaho
Bureau of Alcohol, Tobacco, Firearms and Explosives
1992 in Idaho
August 1992 events in the United States
Sieges involving the United States